Women's freestyle 63 kg competition at the 2010 Commonwealth Games in New Delhi, India, was held on 7 October at the Indira Gandhi Arena.

Medalists

Bracket

Repechage

References

Wrestling at the 2010 Commonwealth Games
Com